State Route 24 (SR 24) is a  state highway in the northwestern and north-central part of the state. The western terminus of the route is near Red Bay at the Mississippi state line, where it continues as Mississippi Highway 76 (MS 76). The eastern terminus of the route is near the junction with SR 67 at Decatur, where it continues for 2 miles as Moulton Street. Moulton Street (without SR 24) ends east of US 31. The route is one of several segments that comprises Corridor V of the Appalachian Development Highway System. Once completed, Corridor V will provide a continuous route between Batesville, Mississippi and Chattanooga, Tennessee.

Route description

SR 24 begins at an unknown point in Decatur, possibly US 31, Grant Street, or Gordon Drive.
Past this point, the route makes a path through one of the more populated parts of Decatur as it heads towards SR 67. At its junction with SR 67, it becomes a four-lane divided highway as it carries on the name of Appalachian Development Highway System's Corridor V from the mile-long stretch of SR 67 in between SR 24 and SR 20.

Past this point, Corridor V makes a turn to the southwest/northeast on its way to Moulton. It climbs up a hill and continues its journey west. It passes by East Lawrence/Caddo in the process.

It continues for about eight miles until it turns directly east-to-west and junctions with SR 157. It almost immediately junctions with SR 33. Past this point, the route is almost entirely flat as it passes through western Lawrence County. It reaches Mt. Hope, junctioning with SR 101.

It proceeds for about fifteen miles to SR 243, which connects Double Springs and Russellville. It almost immediately junctions with US 43/SR 13/SR 17.
It then proceeds onward until it reaches Vina. It eventually reaches Red Bay, which is home to its junction with SR 19. It proceeds for just under a mile to the state line with Mississippi..

The route is mostly an important connector—Alongside SR 157—to the larger cities of Northwest Alabama.

Route history 

In Decatur, Alabama, State Route 24 underwent several different routings from its creation to the present day. In its early years (1928 - 1960), the route headed through Decatur on what is now Moulton Street, a straight road from S.R. 67 to U.S. 31. In the early 1960's, the routing from Danville Road west was changed, heading south on Danville Road to 2nd Street before turning west, following 2nd Street to Gordon Drive, a then-new overpass thoroughfare over the railroads of Decatur; it would proceed to follow Gordon Drive to U.S. 31. In the mid 70's, Gordon Drive was completed from Moulton Street east to the 2nd Street/Gordon Drive Overpass junction. It would follow the now extended Gordon Drive and Moulton Street over to Danville Road (where the previous routing turned south) before proceeding west. In the 90's, the route signage was removed east of S.R. 67, now leaving the actual terminus and routing of S.R. 24 unknown within the confines of Decatur.

From the route's creation in 1928 to sometime in 1952 or 1953, Alabama State Route 24 from Decatur to Moulton winded along present-day Morgan County Road 61 to Five Points, then following present-day County Road 87 from Five Points to Moulton. This corridor is still known as 'Old Moulton Road' in Morgan County to this day. In 1953, the route was routed along what is now known locally as 'Old 24' from Decatur to Moulton; a route that was more direct than the former, albeit passing through several cities. Around 1980, construction of a new four-lane divided highway south of the current route had begun, extending from Alabama State Route 67 to a stub in Landersville. SR-24 was rerouted onto this new highway bypassing formerly-served towns and Moulton around 1984/1985.

Current-Day Lawrence County Route 460 - which is located south of current-day SR-24 - held the SR-24 designation from Landersville west to Russellville as late as the mid 2000's while the four-lane divided stretch was being extended west from the stub in Landersville to another stub in western Russellville. After the rerouting of SR-24 from Landersville to Russellville, the stretch was renamed County Road 460; this designation carries this title along old State Route 24 across Lawrence County. Abandoned and overgrown paving from the routing deviation onto now-County Road 460 is still visible on satellite and ground; although the stub is no longer existent and the divided highway is continuous.

The final stretch of AL-24 to start realignment work was the stretch from Russellville to Red Bay. Arguably the hilliest stretch of State Route 24, this portion of the four-lane divided highway required several ridge cuts and extensive terrain work to complete. The two-lane route it replaced winded on both sides of the new highway, much curvier than the new route. Unlike the rest of old SR-24, this former stretch is impossible to traverse completely due to several bridges being cut along the stretch. Several county roads in Franklin County wind on both sides of the route, carrying the designations 'County Road -24'; with the prefix being sequenced from west to east from 'County Road 124' to 'County Road 724'. All of these county roads once carried the SR-24 name. Each of these county routes start at a junction with 'New 24' and end at a severed bridge or a second junction with the new highway - none of these county routes have a concurrency with the new highway.

The new route includes a bypass around Red Bay, crossing the state line into Mississippi and continuing for about three miles as a four-lane divided highway known as Mississippi Highway 76 (MS 76) before ending at a stub/junction with Mississippi Highway 23 (MS 23). The divided highway may continue all the way to Tupelo or Interstate 22 in the future, but has had little construction past the stub for several years. Ground laying for the continuation is visible from the stub/turnaround, but is dilapidated and unusable.

As of 2021, the entirety of Alabama State Route 24 in Alabama from Alabama State Route 67 west is four-lane; the whole route could be considered four-laned based on what you consider the eastern terminus of the route designation to be.

Major intersections

See also

References

External links

024
Appalachian Development Highway System
Transportation in Franklin County, Alabama
Transportation in Lawrence County, Alabama
Transportation in Morgan County, Alabama